Theriot (also Bayou du Large) is an unincorporated community in Terrebonne Parish, Louisiana, United States. Its ZIP code is 70397.

Notes

Unincorporated communities in Terrebonne Parish, Louisiana
Unincorporated communities in Louisiana
Unincorporated communities in Houma – Thibodaux metropolitan area